Austria competed at the 1964 Summer Olympics in Tokyo, Japan. 56 competitors, 45 men and 11 women, took part in 54 events in 14 sports.

Athletics

Boxing

Canoeing

Diving

Fencing

Five fencers, all men, represented Austria in 1964.

Men's foil
 Roland Losert

Men's épée
 Roland Losert
 Rudolf Trost
 Marcus Leyrer

Men's team épée
 Udo Birnbaum, Herbert Polzhuber, Roland Losert, Rudolf Trost, Marcus Leyrer

Gymnastics

Judo

Modern pentathlon

Three male pentathletes represented Austria in 1964.

Individual
 Udo Birnbaum
 Rudolf Trost
 Herbert Polzhuber

Team
 Udo Birnbaum
 Rudolf Trost
 Herbert Polzhuber

Rowing

Sailing

Open

Shooting

Three shooters represented Austria in 1964.
Men

Swimming

Weightlifting

Wrestling

References

External links
Official Olympic Reports
International Olympic Committee results database

Nations at the 1964 Summer Olympics
1964
Summer Olympics